Areia Branca may refer to:

 Areia Branca (Rio Grande do Norte) – city in Rio Grande do Norte, Brazil
 Areia Branca (Sergipe) – city in Sergipe, Brazil